Chionodes ustor is a moth in the family Gelechiidae. It is found in North America, where it has been recorded from Wyoming, Colorado, Nevada and California.

References

Chionodes
Moths described in 1999
Moths of North America